Very incomplete list

This is a historic list of flexible-fuel vehicles by car manufacturer in alphabetical order:

Audi 
Audi offers the following FFV (E85) models (at least in Sweden, Benelux, France, Germany and Switzerland ):

 Audi A3 1.6e e-power E85 102 bhp 
 Audi A4 2.0 TFSI  flexible fuel 180 bhp

Citroën 

Citroën offers the following FFV (E85) models (at least in Sweden, Benelux, France and Switzerland):
 Citroën C3 Flex ( E100 - Brazil)
 Citroën C4 1,6/2,0 BioFlex
 Citroën C5 2,0 BioFlex

Dacia 

Dacia offers the following E85 models (at least in Sweden):

 Dacia Duster 1.6 16v (E85) 4x2
 Dacia Logan MCV 1.6 16v Hi-Flex (E85)
 Dacia Sandero 1.6 16v Hi-Flex (E85)

Ford, GM, & Chrysler
Ford, GM, and Chrysler offer the following vehicles in the US that use E85 (different models are available outside the US, depending on the country).

2013
 3.6L Dodge Journey
 2.0 L Focus

2012
 2.0L Ford Focus (Late Model year addition)
 1.8L  Chevrolet Cruze 
 3.6L Chevrolet Impala

2011

 2.0L Buick Regal CXL Turbo

2010

 3.0L Ford Fusion and Mercury Milan
 3.0L Ford Escape and Mercury Mariner
 2.4L Chevrolet Malibu
 3.9L Chevrolet Impala LTZ
2009
 2.2L & 2.4L Chevrolet HHR
 4.6L Ford E-Series Van
 5.4L Ford E-Series Van
 5.4L Ford Expedition
 5.4L Ford Expedition EL/Max
 5.4L Lincoln Navigator
 5.4L Lincoln Navigator L
 3.5L Pontiac G6
 
2008
 2.7L Dodge Avenger
 5.3L V8 Chevrolet Silverado
 5.3L V8 Chevrolet Tahoe
 5.3L V8 Chevrolet Suburban
 5.3L V8 Chevrolet Avalanche
 3.5L V6 Chevrolet Impala
 5.3L V8 Chevrolet Express
 3.9L V6 Chevrolet Uplander

2007
 Impala
 5.3L Chevrolet Silverado
 4.6L Ford Crown Victoria (2-valve, excluding taxi and police units)
 5.4L Ford F-150 (3-valve)
 5.3L GMC Sierra (LMG V8)
 4.6L Lincoln Town Car (2-valve)
 4.6L Mercury Grand Marquis
 4.7L Dodge Durango
 4.7L Dodge Ram Pickup 1500 Series
 4.7L Chrysler Aspen
 4.7L Jeep Commander
 4.7L Jeep Grand Cherokee
 4.7L Dodge Dakota
 3.3L Dodge Caravan, Grand Caravan and Caravan Cargo
 2.7L Chrysler Sebring Sedan

2006
 3.0L Ford Taurus sedan and wagon (2-valve)*
 4.6L Ford Crown Victoria (2-valve, excluding taxi and police units)
 5.4L Ford F-150 (3-valve. Available in December 2005)
 4.6L Lincoln Town Car (2-valve)
 4.6L Mercury Grand Marquis

2004–2005
 4.0L Explorer Sport Trac
 4.0L Explorer (4-door)
 3.0L Taurus sedan and wagon (2-valve)

2002–2004
 4.0L Explorer (4-door)
 3.0L Taurus sedan and wagon
 3.3L Dodge Caravan
2002–2003
 3.0L Supercab Ranger pickup 2WD

2001
 3.0L Supercab Ranger pickup 2WD
 3.0L Taurus LX, SE and SES sedan
  3.3L Chrysler Voyager
1999 and 2000
 3.0L Ranger pickup 4WD and 2WD
 3.0L Taurus LX, SE and SES sedan

Many 1995–98 Taurus 3.0L Sedans are also FFVs

Note: * denotes fleet purchase only

Ford of Europe 

Ford of Europe offers the following FFV (E85) models (at least in Sweden, Benelux, France, Germany, Switzerland, Spain, and Finland):

 Ford Focus Flexifuel FFV
 Ford C-Max Flexifuel FFV
 Ford Mondeo Flexifuel FFV
 Ford S-Max Flexifuel FFV
 Ford Galaxy Flexifuel FFV

Ford Brazil
Ford do Brasil offers the following vehicles in the Brazilian market under the label "Flex". These vehicles, are capable of running on any blend from E20-E25 to E100

Ford Courier pickup
Ford EcoSport
Ford Fiesta 
Ford Focus
Ford Ka
Ford Ranger pickup

Fiat 

Fiat offers the following vehicles in the Brazilian market under the label "Flex". These vehicles are capable of running on any blend from E20-E25 to E100

500
 Doblò
 Linea
 Idea
 Mille
 Palio, Palio Fire
 Palio Weekend
 Punto
 Siena
 Stilo
 Strada
 Uno

Holden 
2011 - 2013
 3.0L V6 Commodore VE Series II
 3.6L V6 Commodore VE Series II
 6.0L V8 Commodore VE Series II
2013 - 2014
 3.0L V6 Commodore VF Series I
 3.6L V6 Commodore VF Series I
 6.0L V8 Commodore VF Series I

Honda 

Honda offers the following vehicles in the Brazilian market under the label "Flex". These vehicles, including the motorcycles, are capable of running on any blend from E20-E25 to E100.

Automobiles
 Honda City
 Honda Civic
 Honda Fit
Motorcycles
Honda CG 150 Titan Mix
Honda NXR 150 Bros Mix
Honda GC 150 Fan Flex
Honda BIZ 125 Flex

See also Honda's Brazilian flex-fuel vehicles.

Hyundai

Hyundai offers the following vehicles in the Brazilian market:

 Hyundai HB20

Kia Motors
Kia Motors offers the following vehicle in the Brazilian market.
 Kia Soul
 Kia Sorento

Mercedes Benz 
Mercedes Benz offers the following vehicles in the North American market that use E85: 
2008-
 Mercedes-Benz (W204 platform) C300 Luxury & Sport 3.0L

2007
 Mercedes-Benz (W203 platform) C230 Sedan 2.5L
2005
 Mercedes-Benz (W203 platform) C240 Luxury Sedan & Wagon 2.6L
 Mercedes-Benz (W203 platform) C320 Sedan, Sport Sedan & Wagon 3.2L (2003–2005)

In the Thai market are produced and sold the following models capable of running on any blend between E20 to E85:
2020-
 Mercedes-Benz (H247 platform) GLA200 Progressive & AMG Dynamic 1.3L

Mitsubishi 

Mitsubishi offers the following vehicles in the Brazilian market under the label "Flex" because they are capable of running on any blend from E20-E25 to E100
 Mitsubishi Pajero TR4
 Pajero Sport
In the Thai market are produced and sold the following models capable of running on any blend between E20 to E85:
 Lancer Ex

Nissan 

Nissan offers the following vehicles in the Brazilian market under the label "Flex" because they are capable of running on any blend from E20-E25 to E100
 Livina
 March
 Sentra
 Tiida

Peugeot 
Peugeot offers the following FFV (E85) models (at least in Sweden, Benelux, France and Switzerland):

 Peugeot 307 1,6/2,0 BioFlex
 Peugeot 308 1,6/2,0 BioFlex
 Peugeot 407 2,0 BioFlex

Renault 
Renault offers the following FFV (E85) models (at least in Sweden, Benelux, France and Switzerland):

 Renault Clio III 1.2 16v Eco2
 Renault Mégane / Mégane Touring / Mégane Coupé 1.6 16v Eco2 Flex Fuel
 Renault Kangoo / Kangoo Express 1.6 16v 105 Flex Fuel

Saab 

Saab offered the following vehicles in the European and Australian markets that use E85:.

 Saab 9-5 2.0t BioPower
 Saab 9-5 2.3t BioPower
 Saab 9-3 2.0t BioPower
 Saab 9-3 1.8t BioPower
 Saab Aero-X 2.7T (concept)
 Saab BioPower Hybrid 2.0T E100

SEAT 
SEAT offers the following FFV (E85) models under the label "MultiFuel":

 SEAT León MultiFuel 1.6 MPI E85 102 bhp
 SEAT Altea MultiFuel 1.6 MPI E85 102 bhp
 SEAT Altea XL MultiFuel 1.6 MPI E85 102 bhp

Škoda Auto 

Škoda offers the following FFV (E85) models (at least in Sweden, Benelux, France and Switzerland):

 Škoda Octavia MultiFuel 1.6 MPI E85 102 bhp

Toyota 

Toyota offers the following vehicles in the Brazilian market under the label "Flex". These vehicles are capable of running on any blend from E20-E25 to E100

 Toyota Corolla VVT-i Flex
 Toyota Fielder Flex
 Toyota Etios Flex 1.3L and 1.5L

In the Thai market are produced and sold the following models capable of running on any blend between E20 to E85:

 Corolla Altis Flex 1.6L and 1.8L
 Toyota Corolla Cross 1.8 Sport
 Toyota Camry (2.0L; Discontinued) and 2.5L

Volvo

Volvo offered the following vehicles in the European market that use E85: With the exception of the 2.5FT engine, all engines were derived from Ford and were similar to those used in the Ford Focus and Ford Mondeo.

 Volvo C30 1.8F FlexiFuel
 Volvo S40 1.8F FlexiFuel
 Volvo V50 1.8F FlexiFuel
 Volvo XC60 (concept) 2.5FT FlexiFuel
 Volvo V70 2.0F FlexiFuel
 Volvo V70 2.5FT FlexiFuel
 Volvo V70 T4F FlexiFuel
 Volvo S80 2.0F FlexiFuel
 Volvo S80 2.5FT FlexiFuel
 Volvo S80 T4F FlexiFuel

Volkswagen

Volkswagen offers the following vehicles in the Brazilian market under the label "Total Flex" because they are capable of running on any blend from E20-E25 to E100

 Bora
 CrossFox
 Fox
 Gol
 Golf
 Kombi
 Parati
 Polo
 Routan
 Saveiro
 SpaceFox
 Voyage

The following E85 "Multifuel" models are offered in Sweden, Benelux and Switzerland
 Golf and Golf Plus
 Volkswagen Jetta

There's currently no E85 models offered in Germany. The offered "BiFuel" cars
 Golf and Golf Plus
 Volkswagen Jetta
do only combine Gasoline (E10) with a separate Cargas Tank.

Yamaha 
Yamaha offers the following vehicles in the Brazilian market under the label "Blueflex":

Motorcycles
Fazer 250 Blueflex
Ténéré 250 Blueflex

See also
 List of hybrid vehicles

References

External links
 Green Vehicle Guide 2009: See here the complete list of 2009 models the compiled by U.S. EPA. In the column "fuel" search for ethanol/gas to identify flexfuel models

Car models
Flexible-fuel vehicles
Super ultra-low emission vehicles